To Have and to Hold is a 1916 American silent adventure/drama film directed by George Melford. Based on the 1899 novel of the same name, the film starred Wallace Reid and Mae Murray in her film debut.

The film is based on a novel by Mary Johnston which was turned into a play in 1901 by E. F. Boddington. The Broadway version starred Isabel Irving and Robert Loraine in the lead roles. Also in this play was a 20-year-old actor and aspiring playwright named Cecil B. DeMille.

The film is identified as lost by IMDb.

Cast
Mae Murray – Lady Jocelyn
Wallace Reid – Captain Ralph Percy
Tom Forman – Lord Carnal
Ronald Bradbury – Jeremy Sparrow
Raymond Hatton – Nicolo
James Neill – George Yeardley
Lucien Littlefield – King James I
Bob Fleming – Red Gill
Camille Astor – Patience Worth

Other adaptations
In 1922, a second version was released once again by Paramount Pictures. It starred Bert Lytell and Betty Compson, and is also considered lost.

See also
List of lost films

References

External links
 
 
 To Have and to Hold at the silentera.com database

1916 films
1910s adventure drama films
American adventure drama films
American silent feature films
American black-and-white films
Famous Players-Lasky films
Films directed by George Melford
Films based on American novels
Paramount Pictures films
Films set in the 1620s
Films set in the Thirteen Colonies
Cultural depictions of James VI and I
1910s historical adventure films
American historical adventure films
1916 drama films
1910s American films
Silent American drama films
Silent adventure drama films
Silent historical adventure films
1910s English-language films